St Paul's Cathedral is a cathedral in Tirana, Albania. It belongs to the Roman Catholic Archdiocese of Tiranë-Durrës. The stained glass window to the left of the front door features Pope John Paul II and Mother Teresa. Also a statue of Mother Teresa can be found at the entrance of the cathedral. It is a modern-looking building and does not resemble a traditional church.

Architecture 
When Pope John Paull II visited Albania in 1993, he laid the cornerstone for the church. It was inaugurated on 26 January 2002.

The cathedral is built using a combined triangle and circle shape, representing the Trinity and God's Eternity respectively, and features a relatively plain interior. At the back is a baptismal font with a Paschal candle. A statue of the apostle Paul is set on the top of the building.

See also 
 Rrok Mirdita

References 

Churches in Tirana
Roman Catholic cathedrals in Albania
Roman Catholic churches completed in 2002